Across the Sky is the debut studio album by the electronic artist Space Cowboy. It was released in 2003 through Southern Fried Records. The album contains the singles "I Would Die 4 U" and "Just Put Your Hand in Mine".

Track listing

Release history

References

2003 debut albums
Space Cowboy (musician) albums